The Longhorn is a 1951 American Western film directed by Lewis D. Collins and starring Wild Bill Elliott, Myron Healey, and Phyllis Coates. It was shot at the Iverson Ranch. It was remade as the 1956 film Canyon River.

Plot
The movie opens as Wyoming rancher Jim Kirk flees three bandits intent on robbing the money he earned by selling his Texas Longhorn herd. Back at his ranch, Kirk explains to his cowhand Andy that he is carrying a cashier's check made out to him, because he feared being robbed.

Kirk tells Andy that the price for Longhorns has fallen steeply. Kirk has a plan to breed Longhorns with Hereford cattle. He shows Andy a prototype that he has bred, which will have the stamina of a Longhorn and yield as much beef as a Hereford. The only place to get a herd of Herefords is in Oregon, and driving them all the way back to Wyoming seems insane to everyone but Kirk.

When Kirk deposits his check in town, Andy slips away to meet with Latimer, the gang leader who engineered the failed robbery of Kirk. Andy tells Latimer about Kirk's plan, and they agree to hijack the Herefords as Kirk drives them back to his ranch.

On their way to Oregon, Andy is shot by Native American horse thieves. Kirk walks on foot for miles to find a doctor, who just manages to save Andy's life. While Andy recovers, Kirk buys a herd of Herefords and tries to hire a road crew. Most men turn him down, because driving Herefords over the open range seems impossible. The only men who agree are a bunch of outlaws  whom nobody else will hire.

The cattle drive back to Wyoming is arduous, and the crew grows restless when they run out of meat. Kirk refuses to butcher one of the Herefords. Meanwhile, Andy meets with Latimer to plot the hijacking of the herd. They agree to start a stampede and force the cattle into a canyon, where they will kill Kirk and his crew.

Just before Andy is supposed to start the stampede, Kirk tells Andy that he will be the foreman of the crew when they return to Kirk's ranch, and he also offers Andy an ownership stake in the herd. When the stampede begins, Andy regrets his betrayal, and fires on Latimer and his henchmen. He is killed in the gun battle, but he helps to thwart Latimer's plan. The film ends as Kirk arrives back at his ranch with his Herefords.

Cast
Wild Bill Elliott as Jim Kirk
Myron Healey as Andy
Phyllis Coates as Gail
I. Stanford Jolley as Charlie Robinson
Lane Bradford as Purdy
John Hart as Moresby
Marshall Reed as Latimer
William Fawcett as Ben - bartender
Lee Roberts as Clark - Cowhand
Carol Henry as Frank - henchman
Zon Murray as Tyler

References

External links

1951 Western (genre) films
American Western (genre) films
Films directed by Lewis D. Collins
Monogram Pictures films
American black-and-white films
Films set in Oregon
Films scored by Raoul Kraushaar
1950s English-language films
1950s American films